Roman Ruslanovych Yalovenko (born 8 February 1997) is a Ukrainian professional footballer who plays as an attacking midfielder for Championnat National 2 club Poissy.

References

External links
 
 
 

1997 births
Living people
Footballers from Warsaw
Ukrainian footballers
Association football midfielders
FC Metalurh Donetsk players
FC Stal Kamianske players
FC Shakhtar Donetsk players
FC Avanhard Bziv players
FC Chornomorets Odesa players
FC Olimpik Donetsk players
FC Alians Lypova Dolyna players
AS Poissy players
Ukrainian First League players
Championnat National 2 players
Ukrainian expatriate footballers
Expatriate footballers in France
Ukrainian expatriate sportspeople in France